Southwest Atlanta Christian Academy (SACA) is a preschool to 12th grade private Christian school in southwestern Atlanta, Georgia, United States. Geraldine Thompson is the headmistress and is the wife to Pastor Wayne C. Thompson. Pastor Thompson is the founder of Southwest Atlanta Christian Academy. The school is affiliated with Fellowship of Faith Church in East Point. 

The school is home to the 2006 double GHSA Class A State Champions, Saca Warriors and Lady Warriors.

Notable alumni 
 Javaris Crittenton - former Los Angeles Lakers player, former Washington Wizards player
 Dwight Howard - Los Angeles Lakers player, NBA Champion (2020), 3-time NBA Defensive Player of the Year (2009–11), former Washington Wizards player

Christian schools in Georgia (U.S. state)
Schools in Atlanta
Private high schools in Georgia (U.S. state)
Private middle schools in Georgia (U.S. state)
Private elementary schools in Georgia (U.S. state)